Citrus is the second studio album by American shoegaze band Asobi Seksu. It was released on May 30, 2006, in the United States by Friendly Fire Recordings, and on August 13, 2007, in the United Kingdom by One Little Indian Records.

Three singles were released from Citrus: "Thursday" on August 6, 2007, "Strawberries" on November 12, 2007, and "Goodbye" on February 25, 2008.

Critical reception

In 2016, Pitchfork ranked Citrus as the 37th best shoegaze album of all time.

In popular culture
Music from Citrus was used in the British TV series Skins: "Thursday" appeared in "Tony and Maxxie", the first episode of season 2 (which aired February 11, 2008), and the song "Nefi + Girly" was featured in "Everyone", the first episode of season 3 (which aired January 22, 2009).

Track listing

Personnel
Credits are adapted from the album's liner notes.

Asobi Seksu
 Yuki Chikudate – vocals, synthesizer, organ, toy piano, bells
 Bryan Greene – drums
 Haji – bass, guitar
 James Hanna – guitar, vocals

Additional musicians
 Alex Nazaryan – viola
 Chris Zane – percussion

Production
 Alex Aldi – engineering (assistant)
 Billy Pavone – engineering
 Sarah Register – mastering
 Chris Zane – production, mixing

Design
 Annie Chiu – styling, assistance
 Sean McCabe – art direction, design, photography

Charts

References

External links
 
 

2006 albums
Asobi Seksu albums
One Little Independent Records albums